Africactenus is a genus of mostly African wandering spiders first described by K. H. Hyatt in 1954.

Species
 it contains twenty-one species from Africa and India:
Africactenus acteninus Benoit, 1974 – Congo
Africactenus agilior (Pocock, 1900) (type) – West, Central Africa
Africactenus decorosus (Arts, 1912) – Cameroon, Ivory Coast, Congo
Africactenus depressus Hyatt, 1954 – Cameroon
Africactenus evadens Steyn & Jocqué, 2003 – Ivory Coast, Guinea
Africactenus fernandensis (Simon, 1910) – Equatorial Guinea (Bioko)
Africactenus ghesquierei (Lessert, 1946) – Congo
Africactenus giganteus Benoit, 1974 – Congo
Africactenus guineensis (Simon, 1897) – Sierra Leone
Africactenus kribiensis Hyatt, 1954 – Cameroon, Gabon
Africactenus leleupi Benoit, 1975 – Congo
Africactenus longurio (Simon, 1910) – West Africa
Africactenus monitor Steyn & Jocqué, 2003 – Ivory Coast
Africactenus pococki Hyatt, 1954 – Cameroon, Gabon
Africactenus poecilus (Thorell, 1899) – Cameroon, Gabon
Africactenus simoni Hyatt, 1954 – Cameroon
Africactenus sladeni Hyatt, 1954 – Cameroon
Africactenus tenuitarsis (Strand, 1908) – Cameroon
Africactenus tridentatus Hyatt, 1954 – Zimbabwe
Africactenus trilateralis Hyatt, 1954 – Cameroon, Gabon
Africactenus unumus Sankaran & Sebastian, 2018 – India

References

Araneomorphae genera
Ctenidae
Spiders of Africa